
Gmina Gniewoszów is a rural gmina (administrative district) in Kozienice County, Masovian Voivodeship, in east-central Poland. Its seat is the village of Gniewoszów, which lies approximately 21 kilometres (13 mi) south-east of Kozienice and 102 km (63 mi) south-east of Warsaw.

Villages
Gmina Gniewoszów contains the villages and settlements of Boguszówka, Borek, Gniewoszów, Kociołek, Marianów, Markowola, Markowola-Kolonia, Mieścisko, Oleksów, Regów Stary, Sarnów, Sławczyn, Wólka Bachańska, Wysokie Koło, Zalesie, Zdunków and Zwola.

Neighbouring gminas
Gmina Gniewoszów is bordered by the gminas of Garbatka-Letnisko, Policzna, Puławy and Sieciechów.

References

Polish official population figures 2006

Gniewoszow
Kozienice County